Stefano Razzetti (born September 13, 1971) is a goalkeeper trainer from Italy who currently works for the Swiss football club FC St. Gallen. As a player, he appeared in Serie A and the Swiss Super League.

References

1971 births
Italian footballers
Italian expatriate footballers
U.S. Cremonese players
FC St. Gallen players
FC Lugano players
Swiss Super League players
Italian expatriate sportspeople in Switzerland
Association football goalkeepers
Living people